Shebekino is a town in Belgorod Oblast, Russia, located on the Nezhegol River,  southeast of Belgorod. Population:

History

It was founded in 1713 and was granted town status in 1938.

Administrative and municipal status

Within the framework of administrative divisions, Shebekino serves as the administrative center of Shebekinsky District, even though it is not a part of it. As an administrative division, it is incorporated separately as the town of oblast significance of Shebekino—an administrative unit with the status equal to that of the districts. As a municipal division, the town of oblast significance of Shebekino is incorporated within Shebekinsky Municipal District as Shebekino Urban Settlement.

References

Notes

Sources

Cities and towns in Belgorod Oblast
Belgorodsky Uyezd
Populated places established in 1713
1713 establishments in Russia